Cody Hay (born July 28, 1983) is a Canadian retired pair skater. With Anabelle Langlois, he is the 2008 Canadian national champion. He is now a coach with Langlois.

Career 
Cody Hay teamed up with Annabelle Langlois in 2005. The pair finished 4th at the 2006 Skate America. They were forced to withdraw from their second event, 2006 Cup of Russia, because the airline lost Langlois' skates. Langlois/Hay took bronze at the 2007 Canadian Championships and were named to their first Worlds team. They placed 10th at the 2007 World Championships in Tokyo, Japan.

In the 2007–08 season, Langlois/Hay competed at Skate Canada and NHK Trophy, before winning their first national title at the 2008 Canadian Championships in Vancouver, British Columbia. They went on to compete at the 2008 World Championships in Sweden, where they placed 8th.

Langlois sustained a spiral fracture to her lower right fibula during practice on July 23, 2008 and underwent surgery a week later, after which she had five screws and a metal plate in her ankle. The pair, assigned to the 2008 Skate Canada International and 2008 NHK Trophy, withdrew from both Grand Prix events. Langlois returned to training in mid-September but had trouble walking during a January 6, 2009 practice session. It was determined that she had tissue damage and the pair withdrew from the 2009 Canadian Championships. Around February 2009, she had surgery to remove the screws and metal plate. The pair subsequently withdrew from the 2009 Four Continents Championships and 2009 World Championships.

Langlois/Hay's first international competition back from her injury was the 2009 Nebelhorn Trophy held in Oberstdorf, Germany. Later on in November 2009, they were back on the Grand Prix circuit where they placed 4th at Skate Canada in Kitchener, Ontario. At the 2010 Canadian Championships in London, Ontario, Langlois/Hay won the silver medal behind Jessica Dubé / Bryce Davison and were named to the Olympic team. They placed 9th in Vancouver, British Columbia.

On May 21, 2010, Langlois and Hay announced the end of their partnership; Langlois had decided to retire from competition.

As of September 2011 Hay retired to become a coach with Langlois.

Personal life 
Langlois and Hay married on May 21, 2012. Their daughter, Mia Olivia Hay, was born on March 28, 2013. Their son, Zac, was born in 2016.

Programs

With Langlois

With Hoffmann

Competitive highlights 

GP: Grand Prix; JGP: Junior Grand Prix

With Langlois

With Hoffmann

References

External links

 
 
 Skate Canada profile

1983 births
Living people
Canadian male pair skaters
Figure skaters at the 2010 Winter Olympics
Olympic figure skaters of Canada
People from Dawson Creek
Sportspeople from British Columbia